Kabale District  is a district in the Western Region of Uganda. Kabale hosts the district headquarters. It was originally part of Kigezi District, before the districts of Rukungiri, Kanungu, Kisoro, Rubanda and Rukiga and were excised to form separate districts. Kabale is sometimes nicknamed "Kastone" as in the local language Rukiga, a "kabale" is a small stone.

Location
The Kabale District is bordered by Rukungiri District to the north, Rukiga District to the north-east, Rwanda to the east and south, Rubanda District to the west, and Kanungu District to the north-west.

Population
The national population census and household survey of 27 August 2014, enumerated the population of the district at 230,609. The Uganda Bureau of Statistics (UBOS) estimated the district population, as constituted on 1 July 2020, at 248,700. Of these, 120,000 are estimated to be males and the remaining 128,700 are estimated to be females. UBOS calculated the average annual population growth rate at 1.3 percent, between 2014 and 2020.

Notable people
David Bahati, Ugandan MP infamous in the international community for authoring the 2009 Uganda Anti-Homosexuality Bill
Amama Mbabazi, former Prime Minister 
Ruhakana Rugunda, Former Prime Minister of Uganda
Ezra Suruma, economist
Emmanuel Tumusiime-Mutebile, governor of Bank of Uganda
Shem Bageine, Ugandan politician.
George Kanyeihamba, Retired Judge
Paul Ngologoza OBE, KSG, Author
Anne Kansiime, comedienne, actress, and entertainer

See also
 Kigezi sub-region

References

External links
 Overview of Kabale District In 2013

 
Kigezi sub-region
Districts of Uganda
Western Region, Uganda